Sō, So or Sou (written: 宗 or 宋) is a Japanese surname. Notable people with the surname include:

 (born 1953), Japanese long-distance runner, twin brother of Takeshi
 (born 1953), Japanese long-distance runner, twin brother of Shigeru
 (1715–1786), Japanese painter
 (1207–1274), Japanese Deputy Governor 
 (1568–1615), Japanese daimyō
 (1818–1890), Japanese daimyō
 (1908–1985), Japanese aristocrat

Sō (written: 壮 or 創) is also a masculine Japanese given name. Notable people with the name include:

 (born 1943), Japanese novelist
 (born 1997), Japanese footballer 
 (born 1996), Japanese footballer
 (born 1934), Japanese playwright and screenwriter
 (1908–1977), Japanese production designer 
 (born 1999), Japanese footballer
So Nishikawa (born 2001), Japanese-Australian association football player
 (born 1969), Japanese baseball player
 (born 1973), Japanese athlete and television personality
 (1910–2000), Japanese actor
 (born 2000), Japanese actor

Sō is the romanization of the uncommon Japanese surname written  in Kanji, which derived from the Chinese surname Cao.

Fictional characters 

 So Inuoka (犬岡 走), a character from the manga and anime Haikyu!! with the position of (originally middle blocker) wing spiker from Nekoma High
 Sou Hiyori (日和 颯), a character from the game Kimi ga Shine -Tasuuketsu Death Game-

See also
Sō clan

Japanese-language surnames
Japanese masculine given names